Nigeria's Armed Forces Ruling Council was established by Ibrahim Babangida following the 1985 Nigerian coup d'état that overthrew Muhammadu Buhari. It replaced Buhari's Supreme Military Council, which had been in place since the 1983 Nigerian coup d'état.

Initial membership
	

Of these initial members, only five (Abacha, Dogonyaro, Aikhomu, Nyako and Elegbede) were still members when Babangida stepped down in 1993.

References

1985 establishments in Nigeria
1980s in Nigeria
Politics of Nigeria